The following is a list of universities and other higher educational institutions in Russia, based primarily on the National Information Centre on Academic Recognition and Mobility webpage of the Ministry of Education and Science of the Russian Federation.

The list is arranged in alphabetical order. However, some established names in the Russian language differ from the translations offered below. Occasionally, the names of cities in English are also mentioned alphabetically, although they might not be a part of the actual title. See also: List of medical schools in Russia.

Higher educational institutions

Abakan

 Abakan State Institute of Education
 Abakan State University of Pedagogy
 Katanov Hakassky State University

Angarsk

Angarsk State Technical Academy

Arkyhangelsk

 Arkyhangelsk State Technical University (1929)
 Northern (Arctic) Federal University
 Northern State Medical University (Arkhyangelsk State Medical University)

Armavir

Armavir State Pedagogical University

Astrakhan

 Astrakhan State Technical University
 Astrakhan State Medical University
 Astrakhan State University, former Astrakhan State Pedagogical University
 Astrakhan State Conservatoire

Barnaul

 Altai State Medical University
 Altai State Technical University
 Altai State University
 Barnaul State Pedagogical University

Belgorod

 Belgorod Shukhov state technological university
 Belgorod State Technological Academy of Construction Materials
 Belgorod State University
 Belgorod University of Cooperation Economics and Law

Biysk

 Biysk Pedagogical State University (1939)
 Biysk Technological Institute

Birobidzhan

Sholem Aleichem Amur State University

Blagoveshchensk

 Amur State University
 Blagoveshchensk State Pedagogical University
 Far Eastern State Agrarian University

Bratsk

 Bratsk State Technical University

Bryansk

 Bryansk State University
 Bryansk State Agrarian University
 Bryansk State Engineering Technical University
 Bryansk State Technical University

Chelyabinsk

 Chelyabinsk State University (1976)
 South Ural State University (1943)
 Chelyabinsk Medical Academy
 Chelyabinsk State Pedagogical University

Cherepovets

 Cherepovets State University

Chita

 Chita State University
 Chita State Academy of Medicine
 Chita State University of Polytechnics

Cheboksary

 Chuvash State University
 Cheboksary Cooperative Institute

Dubna
 Dubna International University of Nature, Society, and Human

Elista

 Kalmytzky State University

Glazov

 Glazov State Pedagogical Institute (1939)

Gorno-Altaisk

 Gorno-Altaisk State University

Grozny

 Chechen State University
 Chechen State Pedagogical University
 Grozny State Petroleum Technical University

Irkutsk

 Baykalsky State University of Economics and Law
 Irkutsk National Research Technical University (1930)
 Irkutsk State Academy of Agriculture
 Irkutsk State Academy of Economics (Irkutsk Economics Academy)
 Irkutsk State Linguistic University (1948)

 Irkutsk State University (1918)
 Irkutsk State Medical University
 Irkutsk State Pedagogical College

Ivanovo

 Ivanovo State Power Engineering University
 Ivanovo State University
 Ivanovo State University of Chemistry and Technology
 Ivanovo State Polytechnical University

Izhevsk

 
 Izhevsk State Agricultural Academy
 Izhevsk State Medical Academy
 Udmurt State University

Kaliningrad

 Kaliningrad State Technical University
 Kant Russian State University (1967), former Kaliningrad State University, indirect successor to the Albertina University of Königsberg (founded 1544)

Kaluga

 Kaluga State University (1948)
 Tziolkovsky Kaluga State Pedagogical University

Kazan

 Bauman Kazan State Academy of Veterinary Medicine
 Kazan State Medical University
 Kazan State University of Architecture and Engineering
 Kazan State Institute of Culture
 Kazan State Conservatory
 Kazan State Power Engineering University (1968)
 Kazan Federal University (1804)
 Russian Islamic Institute
 Kazan National Research Technical University named after A.N. Tupolev
 Kazan National Research Technological University

Kemerovo

 Kemerovo Institute of Food Science and Technology
 Kemerovo State University (1973)
 Kemerovo State Medical University
 Kemerovo State Agricultural Institute
 Kemerovo State Institute of Culture (1969)
 Kuzbass State Technical University (1950)
 Kuzbass State University

Kirov

 Vyatka State University

Khabarovsk

 Pacific National University, former Khabarovsk State Technical University (founded in 1958)
 Far Eastern State Medical University
 Far Eastern State Transport University
 Far Eastern State University of Humanities

Kolomna

 Kolomna State Pedagogical University ru

Komsomolsk-on-Amur

 Komsomolsk-on-Amur State Pedagogical University of Humanities
 Komsomolsk-on-Amur State Technical University

Kostroma

 Kostroma State Technological University
 Nekrasov Kostroma State University
 Kostroma State Agricultural Academy
 Kostroma Timoshenko Academy of NBC Defence

Krasnodar

 Krasnodar State University of Arts and Culture
 Kuban State Agrarian University
 Kuban State Technological University
 Kuban State University (1970)
 Kuban State Medical University
 Kuban State University of Sport and Tourism

Krasnoyarsk

 Krasnoyarsk State Agrarian University
 Krasnoyarsk State Institute of Trade and Economics
 Krasnoyarsk State Medical Academy (Russian abbreviation is KrasGMA) (1942)
 Krasnoyarsk State Pedagogical University (Russian abbreviation is KGPU) (1932)
 Krasnoyarsk State Technical University (Russian abbreviation is KGTU) (1956)
 Krasnoyarsk State University (Russian abbreviation is KGU) (1963) (started as a division of Novosibirsk State University, became a standalone university in 1969)
 Siberian Federal University
 Siberian State Aerospace University
 Siberian State Medical University

Kurgan

 Kurgan State University
 Kurgan FSB Border Guard Academy
 Kurgan Maltsev State Agricultural Academy
 Kurgan State Railway Institute

Kursk

 Kursk State University
 Kursk State Medical University
 Kursk State Technical University
 Prof. Ivanov Kursk State Agricultural Academy

Kyzyl

 Tuvan State University

Lipetsk

 Lipetsk State Technical University
 Lipetsk State Pedagogical University

Magadan

 North Eastern State University

Magas

 Ingush State University

Maikop

 Adyghe State University

Makhachkala

 Dagestan State University
 Dagestan State Pedagogical University
 Dagestan State Technical University

Michurinsk

 Michurinsk State Agrarian University

Magnitogorsk

 Magnitogorsk State Conservatory
 Magnitogorsk State Pedagogical Institute

Mirny

Mirny Polytechnic Institute

Moscow

 Academic Law University of the Institute of State and Law of the Russian Academy of Sciences
 Academy of State Fire-Prevention Service of the MIA of Russia
 Academy of the National Economy, attached to the Government of RF
 All-Russian Academy of Foreign Trade
 All-Russian Institute of Continuous Education in Forestry
 Bauman Moscow State Technical University (a.k.a. Moscow State Technical University) (1830)
 Academic Music College - Tchaikovsky Moscow State Conservatory
 Financial University under the Government of the Russian Federation (1919)
 Gerasimov Institute of Cinematography
 Gnessin State Musical College Moscow
 Gubkin Russian State University of Oil and Gas
 Higher Academic School of Graphic Design
 Higher Chemical College of the Russian Academy of Sciences
 Higher School of Economics
 Higher School of Religion and Philosophy
 Independent University of Moscow
 Institute of Asian and African Countries
 Institute of Cryptography, Communication, and informatics by the Academy of FSS of Russia
 Institute for Theoretical and Experimental Physics
 Institute of Topical Education “UrInfo-MSU”
 International Academy for Business and New Technologies
 International Academy of Business and Banking
 International Institute of Economics and Law
 International University in Moscow
 International University of Fundamental Studies
 Kutafin Moscow State Law University
 Maimonid State Classical Academy
 MAMI Moscow State Technical University
 Marysky State University
 MATI Russian State Technological University
 Mendeleev Russian University of Chemistry and Technology
 Military Academy of Air Defence Forces of Russian Federation
 Military Academy of Communication
 Military Academy of Supreme Staff
 Moscow Academy for Tourism, Hotel and Catering Business
 Moscow Academy of Government and Municipal Management
 Moscow Agricultural Academy
 Moscow Architectural Institute
 Moscow Aviation Institute (State Technical University)
 Moscow City Pedagogical University
 Moscow City University of Psychology and Education (1996)
 Moscow Conservatory
 Moscow Engineering Physics Institute (a.k.a. National Research Nuclear University MEPhI (Moscow Engineering Physics Institute))
 Moscow Institute of Economics, Management, and Law
 Moscow Institute of Electronic Technology (Technical University)
 Moscow Institute of Physics and Technology
 Moscow Institute of Steel and Alloys
 Moscow Medical Academy
 Moscow Pedagogical University
 Moscow Power Engineering Institute
 Moscow State Academic School of 1905 Year Memory
 Moscow State Academy of Veterinary Medicine and Biotechnology
 Moscow State Aviation Technological University (MATI)
 Moscow State Construction University
 Moscow State Geological Prospecting Institute
 Moscow State Industrial University
 Moscow State Institute of Electronics and Mathematics
 Moscow State Institute of International Relations
 Moscow State Institute of Motorcars and Roads
 Moscow State Institute of Physics and Engineering (Technical University)
 Moscow State Institute of Radio-engineering Electronics and Automation
 Moscow State Institute of Steel and Alloys
 Moscow State Law University (Kutafin University) 
 Moscow State Linguistic University
 Moscow State Mining University
 Moscow State Night Metallurgical Institute
 Moscow State Open University
 Moscow State Pedagogical University
 Moscow State Social University
 Moscow State Technical University (a.k.a. Bauman Moscow State Technical University) (1830)
 Moscow State Technical University of Civil Aviation
 Moscow State Technological University (a.k.a. STANKIN) (1930)
 Moscow State Textile University (a.k.a. Kosygin Moscow State Technical University) (1930)
 Moscow State University (1755)
 Moscow State University of Agriculture Engineering
 Moscow State University of Applied Biotechnology
 Moscow State University of Civil Engineering
 Moscow State University of Commerce
 Moscow State University of Communication
 Moscow State University of Culture and Arts
 Moscow State University of Economics, Statistics, and Informatics
 Moscow State University of Environment Organization
 Moscow State University of Fine Chemical Technologies (MITHT) (1900)
 Moscow State University of Food Productions
 Moscow State University of Forestry
 Moscow State University of Geodesy and Cartography
 Moscow State University of Instrument Engineering and Computer Science
 Moscow State University of Land Management
 Moscow State University of Printing Arts
 Moscow State University of Railway Engineering (MIIT, 1896)
 Moscow State University of Service
 Moscow State University of Technology "Stankin" (a.k.a. STANKIN) (1930)
 Moscow Technical University of Communication and Informatics
Moscow Technological Institute
 Russian State Agrarian University - Moscow Timiryazev Agricultural Academy
 Moscow University for the Humanities  (1944)
 Moscow University of Consumer Cooperation
 Moscow University of Geodesy and Cartography
 Moscow University for the Humanities
 National Research University of Electronic Technology
 National University of Science and Technology MISiS
 Peoples' Friendship University of Russia (1960)
 Plekhanov Russian University of Economics, previously known as Moscow Commercial Institute (found in 1907)
 Russian Academy of Public Service, attached to the President of RF
 Russian New University (1991)
 Russian Palaeoentomological School (1980)
 Russian Presidential Academy of National Economy and Public Administration - RANEPA
 Russian State Geological Prospecting University - MGRI
 Russian State Hydrometeorological University
 Russian State Medical University
 Russian State Social University
 Russian State University for the Humanities (РГГУ), Moscow (1991)
 Russian State University of Innovation Technologies and Entrepreneurship
 Russian State University of Trade and Economy
 Russian State Vocational Pedagogical University (РГППУ), Yekaterinburg
 Saint Tikhon's Orthodox University
 Russian State University of Tourism and Services Studies
 Sholokhov Moscow State University for Humanities
 Sechenov Moscow Medical Academy
 Skolkovo Institute of Science and Technology
 Stankin Moscow State Technical University (a.k.a. STANKIN) (1930)
 State Academy of Natural Gas and Oil
 State University of Farming
 State University – Higher School of Economics
 State University of Management
 Stroganov Moscow Arts and Industrial Institute
 Surikov Moscow State Academic Art Institute

Murmansk

 Murmansk State Technical University
 Murmansk State Arctic University

Nalchik

Kabardino-Balkarian State University
Kabardino-Balkarian State Agrarian University

Nizhnevartovsk

 Nizhnevartovsk State University for the Humanities
 Nizhnevartovsk State University

Nizhny Novgorod

 N. A. Dobrolyubova State Linguistic University of Nizhny Novgorod
 N. I. Lobachevsky State University of Nizhny Novgorod (1918)
 Nizhny Novgorod State Medical Academy
 Nizhny Novgorod State Technical University
 Nizhny Novgorod State University of Architecture and Civil Engineering
 Volga State University for Water Transport
 Kuzma Minin Nizhny Novgorod State Pedagogical University
 Nizhny Novgorod State Architectural University
 Privolzhsky Research Medical University

Novgorod

 Novgorod State University

Novocherkassk

 South Russian State Polytechnical Institute

Novokuznetsk

 Novokuznetsk State University of Pedagogy
 Siberian State Industrial University

Novorossiysk

 Ushakov State Maritime University

Novosibirsk

 Novosibirsk State University (1959)
 Novosibirsk State Technical University (1950)
 Novosibirsk State University of Economics and Management (1929)
 Novosibirsk State Agricultural University (1936)
 Novosibirsk State University of Architecture, Design and Arts (1989)
 Novosibirsk State University of Architecture and Civil Engineering (1930)
 Novosibirsk State Medical University (1935)
 Novosibirsk State Pedagogical University (1935)
 Novosibirsk State Theater Institute (1960)
 Novosibirsk State Conservatory named after M.I. Glinka (1956)
 Novosibirsk Higher Military Command School of the Ministry of Defence of the Russian Federation (1967)
 Novosibirsk Military Institute named after I.K. Yakovlev of the National Guard Forces Command of the Russian Federation (1971)
 Novosibirsk Institute of the Federal Security Service of the Russian Federation (1935)
 Siberian State Transport University (1932)
 Siberian State University of Water Transport (1951)
 Siberian State University of Geosystems and Technologies (1933)
 Siberian State University of Telecommunications and Information Sciences (1953)
 Siberian Institute of Management of the Russian Presidential Academy of National Economy and Public Administration (1991)
 Siberian Institute of International Relations and Regional Studies (1998)
 Siberian University of Consumer Cooperation (1956)
 Siberian Academy of Finance and Banking (1992)

Obninsk

 Obninsk State Technical University for Nuclear Power Engineering (1953), successor of Obninsk Institute for Nuclear Power Engineering

Omsk

 Omsk Academy of Law
 Omsk State Medical University
 Omsk Regional College of Culture and Arts
 Omsk Regional Museum of The Fine Arts 
 Omsk Road-Transport Academy
 Omsk State Agrarian University (1918) (connected with Omsk State Veterinary Institute and Institute of Agribusiness and Continuing Education)
 Omsk State Pedagogical University
 Omsk State Technical University (1942)
 Omsk State Transport University (1961)
 Omsk State University (1974)
 Omsk Institute of Consumer Service Technology
 Siberian Academy of Physical Culture
 Omsk Foreign Language Institute

Oryol

 Oryol State Agrarian University
 Oryol State Technical University (merged with Oryol State University)
 Oryol State University
 Oryol State Institute of Culture
 Oryol Law Institute
 Oryol State University of Economics and Business
 Russian Federation Security Guard Service Federal Academy

Orenburg

 Orenburg Institute of Moscow State Law Academy
 Orenburg State Institute of Management (OSIM) (1991)
 Orenburg State Pedagogical University
 Orenburg State University (1955)
 Orenburg State Medical University

Penza

 Penza Institute of Technology – Branch of Penza State University
 Penza State Technical University
 Penza State University
 Penza State University of Architecture and Construction
 Penza Artillery Engineering Institute
 Penza State Technological Academy
 Penza State Agricultural Academy
 Penza State Pedagogical University (unified with Penza State University in 2012)

Pereslavl-Zalessky

 University of Pereslavl

Perm

 Perm branch of Higher School of Economics
 Perm State Agricultural Academy
 Perm State Institute of Culture
 Perm State Medical Academy
 Perm State Pharmaceutical Academy
 Perm State Teachers' Training University (1919)
 Perm State Technical University
 Perm State University (1916)

Petrozavodsk

 Petrozavodsk State University
 Petrazavodsk Glazunov State Conservatoire

Petropavlovsk-Kamchatsky

 Kamchatka State University
 Kamchatka State Technical University

Pskov

 Pskov State University
 Pskov State Pedagogical University

Pyatigorsk

 North-Caucasus Federal University
 Pyatigorsk State Linguistic University

Rostov on Don

 Don State Technical University
 Rostov State Academy of Architecture and Art
 Rostov State University of Economics
 Rostov State Medical University RostSMU
 Rostov State University (1915), successor to the Warsaw Russian University (founded 1869)
 Rostov State University of Communication
 Southern Federal University (1915)

Rybinsk

 Rybinsk State Solovyev Aviation technology University

Ryazan

 Ryazan State University
 Ryazan State Agricultural University
 Ryazan State Pavlov Medical University
 Ryazan State Radio Engineering University

St Petersburg

 Admiral Makarov State Maritime Academy, St.Petersburg
 Baltic Institute of Economics and Finance
 Baltic State Technical University
 European University at St Petersburg (ЕУСПб, 1994)
 Hertzen Russian State Pedagogical University
 Lesgaft National State University of Physical Education, Sport and Health
 Military engineering-technical university, St-Petersburg (1810)
 Pavlov St. Petersburg State Medical University
 Petersburg State University of Communication
 Prof. Bonch-Bruevich St. Petersburg State University of Telecommunications
 Pushkin Leningrad State University
 Saint Petersburg Institute of Trade and Economics
 Saint Petersburg National Research University of Information Technologies, Mechanics and Optics, ITMO University (1900)
 Saint Petersburg State Academy of Chemistry and Pharmacology
 Saint Petersburg State Agrarian University (1904) 
 Saint Petersburg State Conservatory (1862)
 Saint Petersburg State Electrotechnical University (1886)
 Saint Petersburg State Institute of Psychology and Social Work (1992)
 Saint Petersburg State Medical Academy (1907)
 Saint Petersburg State Medical University (1897)
 Saint Petersburg State Pediatric Medical University (1925)
 Saint Petersburg State Polytechnical University (1899)
 Saint Petersburg State Technological Institute (1828)
 Saint Petersburg State University (1819) (successor to Saint Petersburg Academy, founded 1724)
 Saint Petersburg State University of Aerospace Instrumentation
 Saint-Petersburg State University of Architecture and Civil Engineering
 Saint Petersburg State University of Civil Aviation (founded in 1955, academy until 01.12.2004 )
 Saint-Petersburg State University of Culture and Arts
 Saint Petersburg State University of Economics (2012)
 Saint Petersburg State University of Economics and Finance (1930-2012)
 Saint Petersburg State University of Engineering and Economics
 Saint Petersburg State University of Refrigeration and Food Engineering (merged with Saint Petersburg National Research University of Information Technologies, Mechanics and Optics since 2012)
 Saint Petersburg State University of Sea and Technology
 Saint Petersburg State University of Service and Economics (1969)
 Saint Petersburg State University of Water Communications (1809)
 Smolny College
 Smolny University
 St. Petersburg Institute of Jewish Studies

Samara

 Samara State Aerospace University
 Samara State Technical University
 Samara State University
 Samara State Medical University
 Samara State University of Teacher Training
 Samara State University of Economics
 Samara State University of communications
 Samara State Institute of Culture
 Samara State Agricultural Academy
 Nayanova University

Saransk

 Mordovian State University
 Mordovian State Pedagogical Institute
 Mordovian Institute of Humanities

Saratov

 Saratov State Agrarian University
 Saratov Regional College of Art
 Saratov State Academy of Law
 Saratov State Medical University
 Saratov State Technical University
 Saratov State University (1909)
 Saratov Conservatory

Seversk

 Seversk State Technological Academy

Smolensk
 Smolensk Humanitarian University
 Smolensk State University
 Smolensk State Medical University
 Smolensk State Agricultural Academy
 Smolensk State Academy of Physical Culture Sport and Tourism
 Smolensk State Institute of Art
 Vasilevsky Military Academy of the Air Defence Forces

Sochi

 Sochi State University
 Russian International Olympic University
 Federal Ecological University
 Sochi Institute of Fashion, Business and Law
 International University of Innovation

Stavropol

 Stavropol State Agrarian University
 North-Caucasus Federal University
 Stavropol State Medical University

Syktyvkar

Syktyvkar State University

Taganrog

 Taganrog State Pedagogical Institute
 Taganrog State University of Radioengineering

Tambov

 Tambov State Technical University
 Tambov State University

Tolyatti

 Togliatti State University
 Tatyshev Volga University

Tomsk

 Tomsk Polytechnic University (1896)
 Tomsk State Pedagogical University (1902)
 Tomsk State University (1878)
 Tomsk State University of Architecture and Building (1952)
 Tomsk State University of Control Systems and Radioelectronics (1962)
 Siberian State Medical University

Tula

 Tolstoy Tula State Pedagogical University
 Tula State University

Tver

 Tver State Medical Academy
 Tver State University
 Tver State Technical University

Tyumen

 Tyumen State Oil and Gas University
 Tyumen State Agricultural Academy
 Tyumen State University
 School of Advanced Studies

Ufa
 Bashkir State University (1957)
 Bashkir State Agrarian University 
 Ufa State Petroleum Technological University
 Ufa State Technical University of Aviation

Ukhta

 Ukhta State Technical University

Ulan Ude

 Buryat State Agricultural Academy
 Buryat State University

Ulyanovsk

 Ulyanovsk State Agricultural Academy
 Ulyanovsk State Pedagogical University
 Ulyanovsk State Technical University
 Ulyanovsk State University

Vladikavkaz

 Highlanders State Agrarian University
 North Caucasus University of Mining and Metallurgy 
 North Ossetian State University
 North Ossetian State Medical Academy

Vladimir

 Vladimir State Humanitarian University
 Vladimir State University

Vladivostok

 Far Eastern National University (1956), successor of Oriental Institute in Vladivostok
 Far Eastern State Academy of Economics and Management
 Far Eastern State Technical Fishing University
 Far Eastern State Technical University
 Far Eastern State University of Communication
 Oriental Institute (1899) (in Vladivostok)
 Vladivostok State University of Economics and Service (1967)
 Vladivostok State Medical University

Volgograd

 Volgograd State Academy of Architecture and Construction
 Volgograd State Medical University
 Volgograd State Pedagogical University
 Volgograd State Technical University
 Volgograd State University

Vologda

 Vologda State Pedagogical University
 Vologda State Technical University

Voronezh
 Glinka Voronezh State Agricultural University
 Voronezh Economics and Law Institute
 Voronezh State Academy of Forestry Engineering
 Voronezh State Academy of Technology
 Voronezh State Agricultural University
 Voronezh State Medical Academy
 Voronezh State Pedagogical University
 Voronezh State Technical University
 Voronezh State University (1918), successor to the University of Dorpat (founded 1802 or 1632)
 Zhukovsky – Gagarin Air Force Academy

Yakutsk

 Yakutsk State University (1956)

Yaroslavl

 Yaroslavl Demidov State University (1918), successor to the Demidov Lyceum (founded 1803)
 Yaroslavl State Pedogogical University
 Yaroslavl State Technical University

Yekaterinburg

 Ural Federal University
 Ural State Academy of Communications
 Ural State Academy of Mining and Geology
 Ural State University of Economics
 Ural State Forestry Engineering Academy
 Ural State Law Academy
 Ural State Pedagogical University
 Ural State University of Railway Transport (1956)
 Ural State Academy of Architecture and Arts
 Urals State Academy of Law
 Ural State Mining University
 Ural State Medical University

Yelets

Yelets Bunin State University

Yoshkar-Ola

Mari State University
 Mari State Technical University
 Volga State University of Technology

Yuzhno-Sakhalinsk

 Sakhalin State University

Others

 Eastern Institute of Economics, Humanitarian Sciences, Management, and Law
 Eastern Siberian State Technological University
 Essentuky Institute of Management, Business, and Law
 Gorky Literature Institute
 Karelsky State Pedagogical University
 Lomonosov Pomorsky State University
 Military – Technical University of the Federal Service of Specialized Construction of Russian Federation
 Missile Forces Military Academy named after Peter the Great
 Northern International University
 Northwestern Academy of Public Service
 Polzunov Altay State Technical University
 Pomor State University
 Puschino State University
 REF (International Name) Institution of Elite Training, attached to the Government of RF
 Rubtzovsk Industrial Institute
 Sergo Ordzhonikidze State University of Management
 Seversk State Technological Academy
 Shahty Institute, branch of South Russian State Technical University
 Siberian Academy for Public Administration
 Siberian Federal University
 Siberian Metallurgic Institute
 Siberian State Academy of Geodesy
 Siberian State Academy of Motorcars and Roads
 Siberian State Aerospace University (Russian abbreviation is SibGAU) (1960)
 Siberian State Industrial University
 Siberian State Medical University (1888)
 Siberian State Technological University (Russian abbreviation is SibGTU), the oldest in the city, founded in 1930 as the Siberian Institute of Forest
 Siberian State University of Communication
 Siberian State University of Telecommunication and Information Sciences
 Siberian Transport University (1932)
 Siberian University of Small Business
 South Russian State Technical University
 Voenmeh Baltic State Technical University
 Vyatka State University of Humanities
 Zabaykalsky State Pedagogical University

Higher education in Siberia

 Abakan State Institute of Education
 Abakan State University of Pedagogy
 Amur State University
 Bratsk State Technical University
 Buryat State Agricultural Academy
 Chita State Technical University
 Chita State University of Medicine
 Chita State University of Polytechnics
 Eastern Institute of Economics, Humanitarian Sciences, Management, and Law
 Eastern Siberian State Technological University
 Far Eastern Federal University (1899)
 Irkutsk Institute of Railway Engineering
 Irkutsk State Academy of Agriculture (Irkutsk Institute of Agriculture)
 Irkutsk State Academy of Economics
 Irkutsk State Linguistic University (1948)
 Irkutsk State University (1918)
 Kemerovo Agricultural Institute
 Kemerovo Art Academy
 Kemerovo Medical Academy
 Kemerovo State University (1973)
 Kemerovo Technological Institute of Food Industry
 Khakass Technical Institute
 Krasnoyarsk State Institute of Trade and Economics
 Krasnoyarsk State Medical Academy (Russian abbreviation is KrasGMA) (1942)
 Krasnoyarsk State Pedagogical University (Russian abbreviation is KGPU) (1932)
 Krasnoyarsk State Technical University (Russian abbreviation is KGTU) (1956)
 Krasnoyarsk State University (Russian abbreviation is KGU) (1963) (started as a division of Novosibirsk State University, became a standalone university in 1969)
 Kuzbass State Pedagogical Academy
 Kuzbass State Technical University
 Kuzbass State University
 Novosibirsk State Agricultural University
 Novosibirsk State Technical University (1950)
 Novosibirsk State University (1959)
 Omsk Academy of Law
 Omsk Medical Academy
 Omsk Road-Transport Academy
 Omsk State Agrarian University (1918) (connected with Omsk State Veterinary Institute and Institute of Agribusiness and Continuing Education)
 Omsk State Pedagogical University
 Omsk State Technical University (1942)
 Omsk State Transport University (1961)
 Omsk State University (1974)
 Omsk University of Consumer Service Technology
 Omsk University of Physical Culture
 Pacific National University, former Khabarovsk State Technical University (founded 1958) 
 Siberian Academy for Public Administration
 Siberian State Academy of Motorcars and Roads
 Siberian State Aerospace University (Russian abbreviation is SibGAU) (1960)
 Siberian State Industrial University
 Siberian State Medical University (1888)
 Siberian State Technological University (Russian abbreviation is SibGTU), the oldest in the city, founded in 1930 as the Siberian Institute of Forest
 Siberian State University of Communication
 Siberian State University of Telecommunication and Information Sciences
 Siberian University of Small Business
 South Ural State University (1943)
 Sukachev Institute of Forest (1944)
 Tomsk Polytechnic University (1896)
 Tomsk State Pedagogical University (1902)
 Tomsk State University (1878), the first university in Siberia
 Tomsk State University of Architecture and Building (1952)
 Tomsk State University of Control Systems and Radioelectronics (1962)
 Tuvan Institute of Humanitarian Research
 Tuvan State University
 Tyumen State Oil and Gas University
 Vladivostok State University of Economics and Service (1967)
 Yakutsk State University (1956)

See also
 Education in Russia#Tertiary (university level) education
 Education in the Soviet Union (Historical)
 Open access in Russia

References

External links

List of institutions in the Russian Federation

Russian culture
Russia education-related lists
Science and technology in Russia
 
Lists of organizations based in Russia
Russia
Russia
Russia